The Blue Heron is a research vessel serving on the Laurentian Great Lakes. She is owned by the University of Minnesota Duluth, and operated by the Large Lakes Observatory in partnership with the University-National Oceanographic Laboratory System.  The Blue Heron is the largest research ship owned by a university operating on the Great Lakes, and the second-smallest UNOLS vessel by LOA.

History 
The Blue Heron was built in 1985 as a fishing vessel and christened "Fairtry" before being purchased by the University of Minnesota in 1997 and converted to a research vessel for deployment in 1998. The ship will celebrate its 25th year of scientific service in 2023.

Activities 
The Blue Heron conducts limnological research on the five Great Lakes throughout the ice-free season. Its capabilities include water and sediment sampling and analysis, sensor launching and retrieval, and radar/sonar scanning. In addition to its research capabilities, the ship also hosts public science outreach and education events in Duluth and other communities.

References

External links 

 R/V Blue Heron website

Research vessels of the United States